In mathematics and physics, specifically the study of field theory and partial differential equations, a Toda field theory, named after Morikazu Toda, is specified by a choice of Kac–Moody algebra and a specific Lagrangian.

Fixing the Kac–Moody algebra to have rank , that is, the Cartan subalgebra of the algebra has dimension , the Lagrangian can be written

The background spacetime is 2-dimensional Minkowski space, with space-like coordinate  and timelike coordinate . Greek indices indicate spacetime coordinates.

For some choice of root basis,  is the th simple root.

Then the field content is a collection of  scalar fields , which are scalar in the sense that they transform trivially under Lorentz transformations of the underlying spacetime.

The inner product  is the restriction of the Killing form to the Cartan subalgebra.

The  are integer constants, known as Kac labels or Dynkin labels.

The physical constants are the mass  and the coupling constant .

Classification of Toda field theories 

Toda field theories are classified according to their associated Kac–Moody algebra.

Toda field theories usually refer to theories with a finite Kac–Moody algebra. If the Kac–Moody algebra is affine, it is called an affine Toda field theory (after the component of φ which decouples is removed). If it is hyperbolic, it is called a hyperbolic Toda field theory.

Toda field theories are integrable models and their solutions describe solitons.

Examples

Liouville field theory is associated to the A1 Cartan matrix, which corresponds to the Lie algebra  in the classification of Lie algebras by Cartan matrices. The algebra  has only a single simple root.

The sinh-Gordon model is the affine Toda field theory with the generalized Cartan matrix

and a positive value for β after we project out a component of φ which decouples.

The sine-Gordon model is the model with the same Cartan matrix but an imaginary β. This Cartan matrix corresponds to the Lie algebra . This has a single simple root,  and Coxeter label , but the Lagrangian is modified for the affine theory: there is also an affine root  and Coxeter label . Due to the single root, there is a single field , so  is simply .

The Lagrangian is then

which is the Sine-gordon Lagrangian.

References

Quantum field theory
Lattice models
Lie algebras
Exactly solvable models
Integrable systems